Yalqışlaq (also, Yalkyshlag and Yalkyshlak) is a village in the Goygol Rayon of Azerbaijan.  The village forms part of the municipality of Qızılca.

References 

Populated places in Goygol District